Martin Kolesár (born 10 December 1997) is a Slovak footballer who currently plays for Slavoj Trebišov as a defender, on loan from Zemplín Michalovce.

Club career

Zemplín Michalovce
Kolesár made his Fortuna Liga debut for Zemplín Michalovce on 12 March 2017 against AS Trenčín, in a 1:4 away defeat. Kolesár replaced Kristi Qose in the 80th minute.

References

External links
 MFK Zemplín Michalovce profile 
 
 Futbalnet profile 

1997 births
Living people
Sportspeople from Trebišov
Slovak footballers
Slovakia youth international footballers
Association football defenders
MFK Zemplín Michalovce players
FK Slavoj Trebišov players
3. Liga (Slovakia) players
2. Liga (Slovakia) players
Slovak Super Liga players